Mirzā `Azīz Kokah, also known as Kokaltāsh and by his sobriquet Khān-i-A`zam ( The Greatest Khan), was the foster brother of Akbar, who remained one of the leading nobles at the courts of the Mughal emperors Akbar and Jahangir. He was also the Subahdar,  governor of the Subah (province) of Gujarat.

Biography

Early life
He was the son of Shams ud-Din Ataga Khan, the Prime Minister of Akbar, and Akbar's wet-nurse, Jiji Anga, hence his Turkish sobriquet “Koka” or “foster-brother.”  Ataga Khan was murdered by Adham Khan, the jealous son of Maham Anga, another of Akbar's wet-nurses, in 1562. Thereafter, Aziz Koka built his father's tomb next to Nizamuddin Auliya in Delhi in 1566–67. Adham Khan, on the other hand, was executed on the orders of Akbar.

After Akbar conquered Gujarat, he made Aziz Koka the governor of the new province. In 1573, the Gujaratis rebelled and besieged Aziz Koka in Ahmedabad. But he defended the city until Akbar's army came to his relief. In 1579, he was made governor of Bihar and ordered to quell a rebellion in Bengal. However, he did not take action until the next year, when the rebels began to take Bihar as well. He was similarly reluctant when ordered to conquests in the Deccan in 1586.

Akbar was very lenient to Aziz Koka, his foster-brother and childhood playmate. Nevertheless, Aziz Koka did not obey Akbar, his emperor, readily. He was especially opposed to Akbar's law to brand all horses, and could not accept prostration in Akbar's new court ritual. When Aziz Koka was summoned to court in 1592, he went on pilgrimage to Mecca instead. There he spent much money on pious causes for a year and a half, until Akbar forgave him, and restored him in his positions.

Later life
During the rule of Jahangir, however, he lost many positions, as he along with Raja Man Singh I supported the rebellion of the eldest son of Prince Salim, Khusrau Mirza,  who was Akbar's choice for his successor and had his rank raised above his father Salim by Akbar. Khusrau's rebellion was crushed in 1606. He was first blinded and then imprisoned. Jahangir in retaliation took away much of their powers, and chided them in the Jahangirnama. Aziz Koka was so much devoted to the cause of Khusrau that he is recorded to have repeatedly declared: 
 Later in life, Aziz Koka regained his position, but his clan could never regain the royal patronage, as they enjoyed during his father's lifetime.

His one daughter was married to the Khusrau Mirza. Another of his daughter, Habiba Banu Begum was married to the fourth son of Akbar, Mughal prince Sultan Murad Mirza in 1587; and had two sons, Rustam Mirza  (b. 1588) and  Alam Mirza (b. 1590).

He built his tomb, Chausath Khamba, literally 64 pillars, during 1623–24, near the Nizamuddin Dargah shrine complex in Delhi.

Notes

Bibliography
 

1542 births
1624 deaths
Mughal nobility
17th-century Indian people
Subahdars of Gujarat
Grand viziers of the Mughal Empire